Fomitiporia gabonensis is a fungus in the family Hymenochaetaceae. It was first isolated from Sub-Saharan Africa, specifically in the Guineo-Congolian forest. It has a pileate basidiome, small basidiospores and an absence of setae. Morphological features that differentiate this species with F. nobilissima and F. ivindoensis are its pileus' shape, pore surface color and diameter, as well as its ecology.

References

Further reading

Cloete, M., et al. "A novel Fomitiporia species associated with esca on grapevine in South Africa." Mycological progress 13.2 (2014): 303–311.

External links

Hymenochaetaceae
Fungi described in 2010
Fungi of Africa